The Stardust fire was a fatal fire which took place at the Stardust nightclub in Artane, Dublin, Ireland, in the early hours of 14 February (Valentine's Day) 1981. Some 800 people had attended a disco there, of whom 48 died and 214 were injured as a result of the fire. The club was located where Butterly Business Park now lies, opposite Artane Castle Shopping Centre.

The nightclub
The building which housed the Stardust was built in 1948.  It was initially a food factory, operated by Scott's Foods Ltd. In 1978, the owners of Scott's, the Butterly family, converted the premises into an amenity centre, consisting of a bar, The Silver Swan, a function room, The Lantern Rooms, and a nightclub, The Stardust.

The club premises consisted of a dance floor, a stage, two bars and two seating alcoves, the North Alcove and the West Alcove. There were also tables and chairs on the dance floor area. The West Alcove area had enough seats for at least 280 patrons.

Fire

The fire occurred on 14 February 1981 around 1.30am, with multiple patrons noticing the fire in different locations and times within the nightclub. There were 841 patrons gathered in the nightclub for the St Valentines eve disco event, and the owners had been given a Special Exemption Order to serve alcohol between 11pm and 2am. In order for the exemption to be given the event was billed as a "dinner dance".

The fire outbreak is believed to have derived from an electrical fault in the room beside the roof space. This non-planning-permission-compliant first-floor storage room contained dangerously flammable materials, including 45five-gallon (23 litre) drums of cooking oil. Staff observed a small fire outbreak on a seat in an alcove behind a curtain and they attempted to extinguish it but failed. The blaze apparently started after fire on the roof from the storeroom came through the roof tiles and emerged into the nightclub's West Alcove banked seating area, falling onto the backrest and the top of a seating bench covered in PVC-coated polyester fabric. The West Alcove area had enough seats to fit at least 280 patrons. The fire was observed by a lady who was sitting in front of the West Alcove. She noticed an increase in temperature but did not smell smoke.

The fire then spread to tables and chairs, and patrons noticed smoke and smelled burning. The fire was very small when first seen in the Ballroom. By 1.45am, a ferocious burst of heat and thick black smoke started quickly coming from the ceiling, causing the material in the ceiling to melt and drip on top of patrons and other highly flammable materials, including the seats and carpet tiles on the walls. The fire flashover enveloped the club and the lights failed. This caused mass panic as patrons began desperately looking for an escape. The DJ announced that there was a small fire and requested a calm evacuation.

The attendees at a trade union function taking place in the same building escaped, but the escape of the Stardust patrons was hampered by a number of obstructions. Of the five emergency exit doors, most were either locked by padlock or chains or blocked by tables or vehicles outside in order to prevent individuals sneaking in. The windows were sealed with metal grilles and steel plates, which were unable to be removed by sledgehammers, axes, and even tow-ropes from individuals outside attempting to aid. Firemen attempted to pull off the metal bars using a chain attached to a fire engine, but were unsuccessful. The failure of the lighting in the club led to widespread panic, causing mass trampling as many of the patrons instinctively ran for the main entrance. Many people mistook the entrance to the men's toilets for the main entrance doors, with responding firemen locating between 25 and 30 of those trapped in the front toilets. A survivor recounted later that in the panic he watched people run in different directions in the pandemonium, and that after evacuating the building he returned and helped others evacuate before tripping and being trampled.

The fire was first spotted by numerous external witnesses as well as a woman 200 metres away from the Stardust, who quickly called the fire brigade. A man was making a phone call to the Gardaí at Dublin Castle at 1.42am The call was terminated by the man hanging up as the first alarm of fire was given to the people in the foyer. The call is as follows:

Gardaí: Hello, yes, hello. 
O'Toole: I'm at the Stardust disco. Can you hear me? 
Gardaí: Yes. 
O'Toole: And my girlfriend's handbag was robbed. 
Gardaí: Your girlfriend's handbag was robbed? 
O'Toole: She's the manageress in the shoe shop in Northside Shopping Centre. 
Gardaí: Wait now would you....Stardust? 
O'Toole: Yes, I'm in the Stardust disco, discothèque, and my girlfriend's bag went missing, someone's after taking it. Can you hear me? 
Gardaí: Yes. 
O'Toole: Can you hear me? 
Gardaí: And where were you... where were... the guards, where will you meet the guards? 
O'Toole: Pardon? 
Gardaí: What's your name... what is your name? 
O'Toole: Hello? 
Gardaí: What is your name? 
O'Toole: [screams in background, caller hung up]"

Emergency response 
Ambulances from Dublin Fire Brigade, the Eastern Health Board, Dublin Civil Defence, the Red Cross, the Order of Malta Ambulance Corps, St John Ambulance Ireland and the Airport Fire Rescue Service were dispatched to the scene.The first fire engine responded around 1.51am and responders discovered bodies piled on top of each other inside the doors. Many ambulances left the scene carrying up to 15 casualties. CIÉ also sent buses to transport the injured, and local radio stations asked people in the vicinity with cars to come to the club. The city's hospitals were overwhelmed by the influx of injured and dying, in particular the Mater, Jervis Street and Dr Steevens' Hospitals.

Family members of victims stated there was no organised transport or support shortly after the fire. They were aided by taxi drivers who waived their fares for the families and were met by ill-prepared Gardaí at the city morgue.

Victims 
The fatalities included 48 people in total; 46 in the fire and two later on with the last recorded death occurring on 11 March 1981, and 214 injured. The ages of those who were killed in the fire ranged from 16 to 26, and in 23 cases the deceased were the eldest and sole breadwinner for their families. Most of the dead came from Artane, Kilmore and greater Coolock, and half of the deceased were aged 18 or younger, with four of the victims aged 16 and eight aged 17.

The fire also was linked to the attempted suicides of about 25 people in subsequent years. The families of the victims and survivors fought in the courts for compensation, accountability, and justice. Victim compensation at the time ranged with a total of £10.4 million paid to 823 individuals; five individuals received £100,000 or more, 24 received slightly more than £50,000 and the majority of individuals received between £5,000 and £10,000. Parents who lost a child in the disaster received a maximum of £7,500.

In 2007, the bodies of five victims whom authorities had been unable to identify were exhumed from a communal plot in St. Fintan's Cemetery, Sutton. The remains were identified with modern DNA analysis, and then given separate burials.

Investigation 
The investigation at the time reported that the fire was an arson. The finding of arson has recently been ruled out by investigators, as there was never any evidence to support the arson finding, even at the time of the tragedy.  A tribunal of inquiry under Justice Ronan Keane, which would hold its first public meeting 12 days after the fire, concluded in November 1981 that the fire was probably caused by arson. This finding, which has been disputed ever since, legally exonerated the Butterlys from responsibility.  However, the inquiry was damning in its criticism of the safety standards. Keane also criticised the Butterlys and the management of the Stardust for "recklessly dangerous practices" when it was discovered that some emergency exit doors had been locked and impeded on the night of the fire.

In 1986 a separate tribunal, called the Victims Compensation Tribunal was headed by Judge Donal Barrington, solicitor Noel Smith and barrister (now Judge) Hugh O'Flaherty, to focus on monetary compensation for the victims and their families. The three men wrote an opinion after hearing testimony from survivors, victims family members and friends and coworkers, which called the treatment of the victims after the fire was neglect as many had received no medical support.

In 2009, four relatives of those who had died in the fire held a sit-in in a security hut at Government Buildings. They were asking the government to publish a report that examined the need to open a new investigation into the disaster. Following the above protests the government commissioned an independent examination by Paul Coffey SC of the case submitted by the Stardust Victims Committee for a Reopened Inquiry into the Stardust Fire Disaster.

Due to the passage of time and lack of physical evidence, it stated that it would not be in the public interest to reopen the public inquiry, but that the public record should be altered to reflect paragraph 6.167 of the original inquiry- "The cause of fire is not known and may never be known.  There is no evidence of an accidental origin: and equally no evidence that the fire was started deliberately" instead of that of arson (which led to the Butterlys' compensation). Following its publication, the Dáil voted on the evening of 3 February 2009 to acknowledge that the arson finding was hypothetical and that none of those present at the Stardust nightclub can be held responsible for the blaze. This led to a correction of the public record and the original arson conclusion was removed as the cause, due to there being no evidence to suggest that the fire was started maliciously. Despite the clear breaches of fire safety regulations, the owners never faced charges and have never apologised.

In June 2018, a campaign was launched to get as many signatures as possible on postcards to appeal to the Attorney General of Ireland to finalize the coroner's reports on the deaths of the 48 young people killed in the fire. On 25 September 2019, the Attorney General confirmed that fresh inquests will be held into the 48 deaths at the 1981 Stardust fire.

Aftermath
The owners, the Butterly family, pursued a claim for compensation against the city because of the arson finding, and were eventually awarded IR£580,000.

The aftermath led to a huge number of recommendations being made in relation to fire safety. Comparisons were made to the Summerland disaster of 1973 in the Isle of Man and the lessons learned in that jurisdiction. However, some basic rules, such as the provision of fire extinguishers and fire exits being left unblocked and obviously posted, which have since been implemented, could probably have prevented many deaths if they had existed at the time.

On 18 September 1993, the Stardust Memorial Park in Bonnybrook, Coolock, Dublin was officially opened by then Lord Mayor of Dublin, Tomas MacGiolla. 
In 2006, the leaseholder and manager of the Stardust at the time of the fire, Eamon Butterly, planned to re-open licensed premises on the site of the Stardust on the 25th anniversary. Described as "insensitive", this action occasioned protests by the victims' families and their supporters. The protests lasted for 10 weeks and ended when the Butterly family agreed to erect a memorial on the site, and change the name of the pub from "The Silver Swan" to the "Artane House". The name "The Silver Swan" was the name of a pub attached to the nightclub, and so was rejected by the protestors.

On 13 February 2011, there was an afternoon Mass at Saint Joseph's Church in Coolock and a wreath was placed at the Stardust Memorial Park. The following evening, a candlelight vigil was held at the Stardust grounds.

Depiction in media

"They Never Came Home"
In July 1985, Irish folk singer Christy Moore was found guilty of contempt of court after writing and releasing a song, titled "They Never Came Home", about the plight of the Stardust fire victims, seemingly damning the owners of the nightclub and the government.  It contained the following lines:

"In a matter of seconds confusion did reign.
The room was in darkness, fire exits were chained."
and
"Hundreds of children are injured and maimed,
and all just because the fire exits were chained."

Because it appeared to imply that the obstruction of the exits was solely responsible for the deaths and injuries, the song was banned and removed from the Ordinary Man album it had appeared on. As the album had just been released, it had to be withdrawn from circulation and re-issued with "Another Song is Born" in its place. Early versions of this album are considered rare and collectible.

The lyrics of the song are still banned in Ireland as libellous. However, a live recording of the song is available on the collection The Box Set: 1964 – 2004 in many other countries, including the UK.

This song was played for 10 weeks outside the Silver Swan as part of the protest over the re-opening of the pub in 2006. It was played every night from 6pm until 8pm while the families and supporters demonstrated in front of the filling station. The song was reputedly played for so long that three tapes failed, leading the protesters to use a CD player, which failed after eight days. They then resorted to an MP3 player (connected to an amplifier), which lasted for the duration of the protest a week later.

Television 

In 2006, Ireland's national broadcaster, Raidió Teilifís Éireann (RTÉ), caused controversy by producing a docu-drama about the disaster entitled Stardust, to mark the 25th anniversary of the incident. The series was based on the book They Never Came Home: The Stardust Story by Neil Fetherstonhaugh and Tony McCullagh. Many families of victims objected to this and were upset by the painful memories it brought up. Reasons for objection were the focus on some key families, which some felt portrayed the disaster as only really impacting a select few, the depiction of the actual fire and a silent roll call of all the victims who perished. A preview of this drama was shown to relatives in early February 2006 and after some minor changes it was broadcast on 12 and 13 February 2006. In this version, the silent roll call was changed to one where all names were read out by survivor Jimmy Fitzpatrick, and a voiceover was added to explain throughout the narrative that the fire impacted many more families and individuals than those portrayed predominantly in the film.

An edition of Prime Time, RTÉ's current affairs programme, broadcast on 14 February 2006, cast doubts on some of the findings of the original tribunal. The programme produced witnesses who were outside the building on the night. Some outside saw fire coming from the roof up to eight minutes before those inside did. New evidence concerning the building's contents and layout was also presented. Important details were also shown regarding the actual location of a storeroom containing flammable materials and cleaning agents. The document plan of the building which the tribunal used, and which was critical to its findings, was shown to be confusingly flawed by locating the storeroom on the wrong level. It showed the storeroom to be "over the basement", but there was no basement in the building, and the store and lamp rooms were located in the roof space on the first floor.

The list of contents of the store was not put before the inquiry and included large amounts of highly flammable and spontaneously combustible materials, mostly polishes and floor waxes, with the inquiry assuming only normal everyday items were inside.

A re-enactment of the fire suggested that it did not happen as the tribunal had found. The programme theorised that the fire started in the roof space where the storeroom was located and had already spread across the main nightclub roof space area before those inside were aware of it.

On 31 January 2011, a documentary entitled Remembering Stardust: 30 Years On aired on TV3. The documentary reflected on the events of the night of the fire, the aftermath and the various controversies and legal proceedings that followed. Survivors Jimmy Fitzpatrick and Antoinette Keegan along with retired Dublin fireman Paul Shannon were among those interviewed.

In December 2017, RTÉ broadcast a one-hour episode of a TV series where Charlie Bird interviewed survivors of the Stardust fire and relatives of some of the 48 people who died in the fire.

On 2 February 2022, TG4 interviewed Lisa Lawlor on their show Finné. Her parents died in the fire when she was just 17 months old.

References

Additional reading 

 
 
 
 
 

Arson in Ireland
1981 fires in Europe
1981 in the Republic of Ireland
Artane, Dublin
Fires in the Republic of Ireland
Nightclub fires
Fire disasters involving barricaded escape routes
Public inquiries in Ireland
1980s in Dublin (city)
February 1981 events in Europe
1981 disasters in Ireland